The Chairman's Handicap is a Brisbane Racing Club Group 3 Australian Thoroughbred open quality handicap, over a distance of 2000 metres at Doomben Racecourse, Brisbane, Australia during the Queensland Winter Racing Carnival. Prizemoney is A$150,000.

History

Top stayers in the race prep for Group 3 Premier's Cup at Doomben later in the carnival and the prestigious Brisbane Cup. The race was inaugurated in 1978 as the Brisbane Amateur Turf Club Handicap with Proficient victorious in a time of 2:05.6.

Name
1978 - BATC Handicap 
1979 - Haig Handicap
1980 - BATC Handicap
1981 - Haig Handicap
1982–1983 - XXXX Handicap
1984–1987 - Chairman’s Handicap
1988 - Carnival Handicap
1989–2007 - Chairman’s Handicap
2008 - Riverview Hotel Handicap
2009–2015 - Chairman’s Handicap
2016 - JRA Cup 
2017 onwards - Chairman’s Handicap

Grade
1978–1979 - Principal Race
1980–1994 - Listed Race
1995 onwards Group 3

Distance

1978–1987 – 2020 metres 
1988 – 2029 metres
1989–1999 – 2020 metres 
 2000 – 2040 metres
2001–2011 – 2020 metres 
2012–2014 – 2000 metres
2015 – 2200 metres
2016 onwards - 2000 metres

Venue
1978–2013 - Doomben Racecourse
2013 - Eagle Farm Racecourse
2014 - Doomben Racecourse
2015 - Gold Coast Racecourse
2016–2021 - Doomben Racecourse
2022 - Eagle Farm Racecourse

Winners

 2022 - Yonkers
 2021 - Warning
 2020 - Le Juge
 2019 - Le Juge
 2018 - Anton En Avant
 2017 - Stampede
 2016 - Real Love
 2015 - Epingle
 2014 - Pretty Pins
 2013 - Quintessential
 2012 - Hume
 2011 - Humma
 2010 - Crossthestart
 2009 - Ballack
 2008 - Fulmonti
 2007 - Mandela
 2006 - Art Success
 2005 - Zingam
 2004 - So Assertive
 2003 - Another Warrior
 2002 - Society Beau
 2001 - Citi Habit
 2000 - Kazakh Belle
 1999 - Cronus
 1998 - Yacquina Bay
 1997 - Iron Horse
 1996 - Juggler
 1995 - Arborea
 1994 - Salcantay 
 1993 - Silk Ali 
 1992 - Full Suit 
 1991 - Majestic Boy
 1990 - Sir Nova
 1989 - Miss Fleet
 1988 - Miss Stephenson
 1987 - Greatness
 1986 - †Noble Son / Restoration
 1985 - †Crawford / Bucking Rip
 1984 - I Will
 1983 - Lord Seaman
 1982 - Astrolin
 1981 - Pelican Point
 1980 - Lowan Star
 1979 - Brazen Gambler
 1978 - Proficient 

† Run in two divisions

See also
 List of Australian Group races
 Group races

References

Horse races in Australia
Sport in Brisbane